Little Red Riding Hood is a folk tale character.

Red Riding Hood, Little Red Riding Hood or Rotkäppchen (German) may also refer to:

Fictional entities
 Little Red Riding Hood (Shrek), a character in the Shrek franchise
 Red Riding Hood (Once Upon a Time) (known as Red Lucas, also known as Ruby), a character from the ABC television series Once Upon a Time.

Films
 Red Riding Hood (1901 film), a 1901 French silent film directed by Georges Méliès
 Little Red Riding Hood (1918 film), an American fantasy film directed by Otis B. Thayer
 Little Red Riding Hood (1920 film), silent Czech film
 Little Red Riding Hood (1922 film), a Disney animated short film
 Little Red Riding Hood (1953 film), a German film directed by Fritz Genschow
 Little Red Riding Hood (1954 film), a German live-action film directed by Walter Janssen
 Little Red Riding Hood (2022 film), a Russian film

 Rotkäppchen, a 1962 East German film
 Red Riding Hood (1989 film), an Israeli-American live-action musical fantasy film directed by Adam Brooks
 Little Red Riding Hood (1997 film), a 1997 short
 Red Riding Hood (2003 film), an Italian horror film
 Red Riding Hood (2006 film), an American musical film
 Red Riding Hood (2011 film), an American dark fantasy film

Musical works
 Little Red Riding Hood (album), by Lost Dogs
 Little Red Riding Hood (opera), a 1911 opera by César Cui
 "Li'l Red Riding Hood", a 1966 song recorded by Sam the Sham and the Pharaohs 
 "Little Red Riding Hood and the Wolf", a title given to No. 6 of Rachmaninoff's Op. 39 Études-Tableaux

Other 
 "Little Red Riding Hood" (Faerie Tale Theatre episode)
 Little Red Riding Hood (Pinkney book), a 2007 children's picture book by Jerry Pinkney.
 Red Riding Hood, a cultivar of Mandevilla sanderi, a plant also called Dipladenia sanderi and Brazilian jasmine
 Rotkäppchen or Rotkäppchen-Mumm wine, a brand of sparkling wine from Freyburg, Germany

See also
 Adaptations of Little Red Riding Hood
 Red Riding, Yorkshire crime drama